Maomingosuchus is an extinct genus of gavialoid crocodylian from Late Eocene of Southeast Asia. It was discovered in Priabonian-aged deposits of China and possibly also Thailand. The type species, originally Tomistoma petrolica, was named in 1958 and was redescribed as Maomingosuchus in 2017. A second species, Maomingosuchus acutirostris, was described in 2022 from middle-upper Eocence deposits (late Bartonian–Priabonian age, 39–35 Ma) of the Na Duong Basin in northern Vietnam. It is proposed to be a basal member of Gavialoidea, or alternatively within the family Tomistominae.

References 

Crocodilians
Eocene crocodylomorphs
Fossil taxa described in 2017
Eocene reptiles of Asia
Prehistoric pseudosuchian genera